An Affair of the Skin is a 1963 drama film written and directed by Ben Maddow. It is a complex story of the romantic entanglements of its several characters as seen through the eyes of a black woman photographer. Shortly after its release, the film was harshly reviewed in Time and The New York Times. Woody Haut's more recent characterization is more sympathetic:

Maddow is reported as feeling that the initial release of An Affair of the Skin had been rushed for financial reasons. In 1973, 10 years after its initial release, Maddow re-edited and released it again under the title Love As Disorder. As described by John Hagan, "An offscreen narration by the photographer was added to establish her as an observer: a participant in the action, but also a caustic chronicler of it. As in much of Maddow's work, inner disorder is seen against a background of social unrest as described in a highly imagistic manner by a person who has both emotional involvement and critical detachment."

Premise
Set in New York, the drama describes the sexual relations of the three main characters, Victoria, Allen, and his wife Katherine, including the problems they encounter as told in three intertwined stories. Victoria is an aging fashion model who is afraid to let go of her young male lover because she thinks she is too old to ever get another man to love her. Allen and Katherine are an unhappily married neurotic couple with problems of their own.

Cast 

Victoria - Viveca Lindfors
Allen McCleod - Kevin McCarthy
Katherine McCleod - Lee Grant
Janice - Diana Sands
Max - Herbert Berghof
Claire - Nancy Malone
Mrs. Cluny - Osceola Archer
Waiter - Will Lee

See also
List of American films of 1963

References

External links

1963 films
1963 drama films
American drama films
American independent films
American black-and-white films
1960s English-language films
Films set in New York City
Films shot in New York City
1963 independent films
1960s American films